Lombo Airport  was an airstrip serving Lombo, a hamlet in the Nord-Ubangi Province of the Democratic Republic of the Congo.

The last Google Earth Historical Imagery satellite image to show the former  grass runway is (12/30/1986).

See also

Transport in the Democratic Republic of the Congo
List of airports in the Democratic Republic of the Congo

References

External links
OpenStreetMap - Lombo
Google Maps - Lombo

Airports in the Nord-Ubangi Province